XEROPJ-AM is a radio station on 1030 AM in Lagos de Moreno, Jalisco, Mexico. It is owned by GlobalMedia and will be known as W Radio with programming from W Radio.

History
XEROPJ was awarded in the IFT-4 radio auction of 2017 and is one of three stations GlobalMedia companies obtained in the auction. The frequency had previously been occupied by XELJ-AM, which migrated to FM as XHLJ-FM 105.7; XEROPJ is broadcast from the former XELJ transmitter.

References

Radio stations in Jalisco
Radio stations established in 2019
2019 establishments in Mexico